"Cupid" is the second single of Lloyd's fourth studio album King of Hearts. It was released March 22, 2011 & it features Polow da Don under the name Awesome Jones!!!!. The track was produced by Polow da Don, Greg Curtis and written by Brandon "Bei Maejor" Green, Jason Perry, Curtis. The horns were played by Siraaj Amnesia James.  The single was only released in the United States, where it reached #2 on the Bubbling Under Hot 100 chart.

Music video
A music video to accompany the release of "Cupid" was first released onto YouTube on March 21, 2011 at a total length of four minutes and one seconds.

Remix
The official remix was released on June 17, 2011 on Lloyd's YouTube page & posted the video on his blog, the remix features G-Unit rapper Lloyd Banks & Awesome Jones!!!!.

Credits and personnel
Lead vocals – Lloyd
Producers – Polow da Don, Greg Curtis
Lyrics – Bei Maejor, Polow A. Jones, Jason Perry, Greg Curtis
Horns - Siraaj Amnesia James
Label: Zone 4, Interscope Records

Charts

Weekly charts

Year-end charts

References

2011 singles
Lloyd (singer) songs
Songs written by Polow da Don
Song recordings produced by Polow da Don
2011 songs
Songs written by Maejor
Interscope Records singles
Cupid in music